KCLG-LD, virtual and UHF digital channel 32, was a low-powered TBN-affiliated television station licensed to Neosho, Missouri, United States. Founded on August 16, 1988, the station was owned by Gary and Deborah Kenny.

History
The station, initially with call letters K32CL, began as an original construction permit issued August 16, 1988 to Gary M. and Deborah R. Kenny. It was licensed on June 30, 1989, serving the Neosho area on channel 32. In September 1998, the Kennys changed the station's call letters to KJPX-LP and in October 2001, upgraded the station's license to Class A. The Kennys again changed the station's call letters in April 2002 to KCLG-CA and again to KCLG-LP. The KJPX-LP call letters would end up on another television station owned by the Kennys in Joplin. On May 30, 2012, the station's call sign was changed to KCLG-LD.

The Federal Communications Commission cancelled the station's license effective February 8, 2022.

External links
Ion Television website

Ion Television affiliates
CLG-LD
Television channels and stations established in 1988
1988 establishments in Missouri
Low-power television stations in the United States
Defunct television stations in the United States
Television channels and stations disestablished in 2022
2022 disestablishments in Missouri
CLG-LD